Leeds Carnegie F.C. was an English football club based in Farsley, Leeds, West Yorkshire. They were established in 1970 and were affiliated with Leeds Metropolitan University and disbanded in 2011.

History
The club was founded in 1970 as Leeds & Carnegie College F.C., they were entered into the Yorkshire Football League Division Three during that year and were promoted during their debut season. Leeds & Carnegie were promoted as Yorkshire League Division Two champions in 1972–73 and would stay in the league system until 1979. They had a decent run in the FA Vase during the 1976–77 season, before going out to Newcastle Blue Star 1–0 in the fourth round.

During 1980, the club were entered into the Northern Universities League, they went under the name Leeds Polytechnic for much of this period, winning the Premier Division of this set-up a total of nine times. The name of the club was changed to Leeds Met Carnegie during the early part of the 1990s.

Recent times
In 2004, Leeds Met left the Northern Universities League for the West Yorkshire League, which is a part of the English football pyramid. The club were victorious and were crowned champions of the league's Premier Division in 2005–06, however due to not having a ground up to the standards of the division above, they were not promoted.

However, after some re-organising after the 2006–07 season, the club were accepted into the Northern Counties East League Division One which lies at level 10 on the English football pyramid. They shared the Throstle Nest ground of Farsley A.F.C. who currently play in the National League North.

Prior to the club's dissolution, one of their final managers was Graham Potter, who went on to become manager of Premier League team Chelsea F.C. in 2022.

Honours
Yorkshire League Division Two
Champions: 1972–73
Yorkshire League Division Three
Champions: 1970–71
West Yorkshire League Premier Division
Champions: 2005–06Northern Universities League'''
Champions: 1980–81, 1981–82, 1982–83, 1988–89, 1991–92, 1994–95, 2000–01, 2002–03, 2003–04

References

External links
Official website

Defunct football clubs in England
Defunct football clubs in West Yorkshire
Sport in Leeds
Association football clubs established in 1970
Association football clubs disestablished in 2011
1970 establishments in England
2011 disestablishments in England
Yorkshire Football League
West Yorkshire Association Football League
Northern Counties East Football League
FC
University and college football clubs in England